Robbie Nishida (born December 26, 1977) is a professional drifter who currently competes in several different professional series' around the world, including Formula D USA series and Formula D World series. He has been competing in the Formula D USA series since 2005.  He has been competing ever since both in Japan and the USA.

Quick Facts

Bio
 Nickname - Bushido
 Height – 5’ 11”
 Weight – 160 lbs
 Car Number – 31
 Hometown – Okinawa, Japan
 Team – Achilles Radial (Formula DRIFT) USA
       - Achilles Radial Formula D Asia
 Crew Members – Mike Warfield, Erick Gomez, and Joe Tardiff  (Formula D) USA

Current Sponsors
 Achilles Radial
 Oracle Lighting
 Motovicity Distribution
 BC Racing Suspension
 Garrett Turbos
 SPEC Clutch
 Deatschwerks
 Voodoo13 USA
 MazWorx Engines
 Takata
 Turbo Smart
 Goodridge
 Illest / Fatlace
 Brian Crower
 Seibon
 AME Wheels
 JE Pistons
 Nitrous Express
 OS Giken
 TOP 1 Oil

Career
He was born in Okinawa to Japanese mother Hiroko Nishida and James Kiester, a US Air Force retired senior master sergeant. At age 5, he moved to the Yokota area and has been there ever since.  He was first exposed to drifting on the mountains of Japan around the age of 20. He has been drifting professionally since 1998. In his first FD event at Wall Speedway in 2005, he placed fourth in Nobushige Kumakubo's orange Silvia-truck running on sponsored Falken Tires, by beating Samuel Hubinette, the then reigning 2004 FD Champion, in a tandem battle.  His wife, Christine Nishida, is a civilian working for the US military as secretary for Marine Corps Brig. Gen. John Toolan.  They have a 13-year-old son.

Cars Driven

1993 Bridges Racing, Achilles Radial Lexus SC300
 Tires – Achilles Radial
 Engine – stroked 3.4L 2JZ, custom Portland Speed Industries (PSI) turbo manifold, Garrett GTX4294R Turbo, TurboSmart Waste Gates, BC internals, & AEM EMS 
 Horsepower – 818 whp 738 ft-lbs of torque 
 Suspension – BC Racing Suspension
 Brakes – Factory fronts and Wilwood Rears
 Wheels – Volks Racing Gram Lights 57D
 Exterior – Vertex Body Kit
 Interior – Sparco seat, steering wheel, and harness. 
 Series - Formula D USA 2012

Bridges Racing Nissan 240SX 
 Engine – Supercharged 4.0L VQ
 Series - Formula D USA 2011

2009 Hankook Nissan GT-R (RWD)
 Tires – Hankook RS-3 tires
 Engine – Turbocharged VQ35 stroker Kit
 Transmission - G-Force 4-Speed Dog Box Transmission
 Suspension – KW Coil Over kit
 Wheels – MONO Forged wheels by Savini
 Series - Formula D USA 2010 (minus round 1)

Hankook Tire/Gruppe S Nissan 350Z
 Engine - Turbocharged VQ
 Series - Formula D USA 2009

Falken Tire Nissan S14 240SX
 Series - Formula D USA 2007, D1GP USA  2007

Achievements

Formula Drift USA 2012 Finished 13th Overall (320.75 pts)
 Won Most Improved Driver Award 
 Placed Top 32 at Formula Drift Round 1, Streets of Long Beach, CA (Qualified 25th) 
 Placed Top 32 at Formula Drift Round 2, Road Atlanta Raceway, GA (Qualified 30th) 
 Placed Top 16 at Formula Drift Round 3, Palm Beach International Raceway, FL (Qualified 30th) 
 Placed Top 16 at Formula Drift Round 4, The Wall, NJ (Qualified 15th) 
 Placed Top 32 at Formula Drift Round 5, Evergreen Speedway, WA (Qualified 18th) 
 Placed 4th at Formula Drift Round 6, Las Vegas Motor Speedway, NV (Qualified 3rd) 
 Placed Top 8 at Formula Drift Round 7, Irwindale Speedway, CA (Qualified 19th)

Formula Drift Asia 2012 
 Won Best Drift Style Award 
 Placed 4th at Formula Drift Asia Singapore (Qualified 4th) 
 Placed 4th at Formula Drift Asia Indonesia (Qualified 3rd)

Formula Drift USA 2011 Finished 34th Overall (120.25 pts)
 Placed Top 32 at Formula Drift Round 5, Evergreen Speedway, WA (Qualified 28th) 
 Placed Top 32 at Formula Drift Round 6, Las Vegas Motor Speedway, NV (Qualified 3rd) 
 Placed Top 8 at Formula Drift Round 7, Irwindale Speedway, CA (Qualified 8th)

Formula Drift Asia 2011 
 Placed Top 16 at Formula Drift Asia Singapore 
 Placed Top 16 at Formula Drift Asia Indonesia 
 Placed Top 32 at Formula Drift Asia Malaysia

Formula Drift USA 2010 Finished 31st Overall (129.25 pts) 
 Placed Top 16 at Formula Drift Round 2, Road Atlanta Raceway, GA (Qualified 11th) 
 Placed Top 32 at Formula Drift Round 3
 Placed Top 32 at Formula Drift Round 4, The Wall, NJ (Qualified 28th) 
 Placed Top 32 at Formula Drift Round 5, Evergreen Speedway, WA (Qualified 21st) 
 Placed Top 32 at Formula Drift Round 7, Irwindale Speedway, CA (Qualified 17th)

Formula Drift USA 2009 Finished 8th Overall (425.25 pts) 
 Placed 4th at Formula Drift Round 1, Streets of Long Beach, CA (Qualified 8th) 
 Placed Top 8 at Formula Drift Round 2, Road Atlanta Raceway, GA (Qualified 11th) 
 Placed Top 8 at Formula Drift Round 3
 Placed Top 16 at Formula Drift Round 4, The Wall, NJ (Qualified 14th) 
 Placed Top 16 at Formula Drift Round 5, Evergreen Speedway, WA (Qualified 16th) 
 Placed Top 16 at Formula Drift Round 6, Las Vegas Motor Speedway, NV (Qualified 1st) 
 Placed Top 8 at Formula Drift Round 7, Irwindale Speedway, CA (Qualified 10th)

Formula Drift USA 2008 Finished 10th Overall (318.25 pts) 
 Placed Top 32 at Formula Drift Round 1
 Placed Top 16 at Formula Drift Round 2
 Placed Top 8 at Formula Drift Round 4
 Placed 3rd at Formula Drift Round 5
 Placed Top 16 at Formula Drift Round 6
 Placed Top 8 at Formula Drift Round 7

Formula Drift USA 2007 Finished 16th Overall (222.25 pts) 
 Placed Top 16 at Formula Drift Round 1
 Placed Top 32 at Formula Drift Round 2
 Placed Top 16 at Formula Drift Round 4
 Placed Top 16 at Formula Drift Round 6
 Placed Top 16 at Formula Drift Round 7

References

External links
 Formula D Driver Profile

Living people
Drifting drivers
Formula D drivers
1977 births